This is a table of European Parliament constituencies in Ireland, listing the number of Members of the European Parliament each elected at each European Parliament election.

The names and borders of the constituencies have varied over time, but they have used single transferable vote since their creation.

European Parliament constituencies since 1979

See also
Northern Ireland (European Parliament constituency)

References